Mathies is a surname. Notable people with the surname include:

A'dia Mathies (born 1991), American basketball player
Archibald Mathies (1918–1944), United States Army Air Forces soldier and Medal of Honor recipient
Paul Mathies (1911–?), German footballer

See also
Mathys
Matthys